Yawaraka Sangokushi Tsukisase!! Ryofuko-chan is a Japanese manga and anime, loosely based on Luo Guanzhong's 14th century novel Romance of the Three Kingdoms.

It began in the comedy manga I, Otaku: Struggle in Akihabara by Jiro Suzuki, which the characters watched in their world.  It was turned by Square Enix into a real manga in Monthly GFantasy magazine.  It was later turned into an anime by Starchild.

Cast
Yuki Matsuoka as Ryofuko
Akemi Satō as Rena
Chinami Nishimura as Chin Kyuu
Fumihiko Tachiki as Kanu
Hiroyuki Yoshino as Sou Sou
Jouji Nakata as Kakou Ton
Junko Noda as Asumi
Kanako Tateno as Nami
Keiichi Sonobe as Sekitome
Norio Wakamoto as Kou Jun
Yuri Shiratori as Eri Matsuoka
Kiyoyuki Yanada as Fisherman A
Mitsuaki Madono as Fisherman B

Episode list

References

External links

2007 anime OVAs
Works based on Romance of the Three Kingdoms